Tillers of the Soil (French:L'âtre) is a 1923 French silent drama film directed by Robert Boudrioz and starring Charles Vanel, Jacques de Féraudy and Renée Tandil.

Cast
 Charles Vanel as Bernard Larade 
 Jacques de Féraudy as Jean Larade 
 Renée Tandil as Arlette  
 Maurice Schutz as Grand-père  
 René Donnio as Le domestique

References

Bibliography
 Powrie, Phil & Rebillard, Éric. Pierre Batcheff and stardom in 1920s French cinema. Edinburgh University Press, 2009

External links

1923 films
Films directed by Robert Boudrioz
French silent feature films
1923 drama films
French drama films
French black-and-white films
Silent drama films
1920s French films
1920s French-language films